The 1994 Mecklenburg-Vorpommern state election was held on 16 October 1994 to elect the members of the 2nd Landtag of Mecklenburg-Vorpommern. The incumbent government was a coalition of the Christian Democratic Union (CDU) and Free Democratic Party (FDP) led by Minister-President Berndt Seite. While the CDU remained the largest party in the Landtag, the FDP suffered a 1.7-point swing and lost all its seats. The CDU subsequently formed a grand coalition with the Social Democratic Party (SPD), and Seite continued in office.

Parties
The table below lists parties represented in the 1st Landtag of Mecklenburg-Vorpommern.

Election result

|-
! colspan="2" | Party
! Votes
! %
! +/-
! Seats 
! +/-
! Seats %
|-
| bgcolor=| 
| align=left | Christian Democratic Union (CDU)
| align=right| 368,206
| align=right| 37.7
| align=right| 1.7
| align=right| 30
| align=right| 1
| align=right| 42.3
|-
| bgcolor=| 
| align=left | Social Democratic Party (SPD)
| align=right| 288,431
| align=right| 29.5
| align=right| 2.5
| align=right| 23
| align=right| 2
| align=right| 32.4
|-
| bgcolor=| 
| align=left | Party of Democratic Socialism (PDS)
| align=right| 221,814
| align=right| 22.7
| align=right| 7.0
| align=right| 18
| align=right| 6
| align=right| 25.4
|-
! colspan=8|
|-
| bgcolor=| 
| align=left | Free Democratic Party (FDP)
| align=right| 37,498
| align=right| 3.8
| align=right| 1.7
| align=right| 0
| align=right| 4
| align=right| 0
|-
| bgcolor=| 
| align=left | Alliance 90/The Greens (Grüne)
| align=right| 36,035
| align=right| 3.7
| align=right| 5.6
| align=right| 0
| align=right| ±0
| align=right| 0
|-
| bgcolor=|
| align=left | Others
| align=right| 25,883
| align=right| 2.6
| align=right| 
| align=right| 0
| align=right| ±0
| align=right| 0
|-
! align=right colspan=2| Total
! align=right| 977,867
! align=right| 100.0
! align=right| 
! align=right| 71
! align=right| ±0
! align=right| 
|-
! align=right colspan=2| Voter turnout
! align=right| 
! align=right| 72.9
! align=right| 8.1
! align=right| 
! align=right| 
! align=right| 
|}

Notes

Sources
 Landtagswahlen Mecklenburg-Vorpommern

1994 elections in Germany
1994
1990s in Mecklenburg-Western Pomerania